The Columbus Channel or Serpent's Mouth, is a strait lying between Icacos Point in southwest Trinidad and Tobago and the north coast of Venezuela. It leads from the Atlantic Ocean to the Gulf of Paria.

History 

The passage was named by Christopher Columbus on his third voyage.

References

Gulf of Paria
Straits of Venezuela
Bodies of water of Trinidad and Tobago
International straits
Trinidad and Tobago–Venezuela border